William Pagan may refer to:
 William Pagan (politician)
 William Pagan (railway engineer)